David Jon Gilmour  (born 6 March 1946) is an English guitarist, singer, songwriter, and member of the rock band Pink Floyd. He joined as guitarist and co-lead vocalist in 1967, shortly before the departure of founding member Syd Barrett. Pink Floyd achieved international success with the concept albums The Dark Side of the Moon (1973), Wish You Were Here (1975), Animals (1977), The Wall (1979), and The Final Cut (1983). By the early 1980s, they had become one of the highest-selling and most acclaimed acts in music history; by 2012, they had sold more than 250 million records worldwide, including 75 million in the United States. Following the departure of Roger Waters in 1985, Pink Floyd continued under Gilmour's leadership and released three more studio albums. 

Gilmour has produced a variety of artists, such as the Dream Academy, and has released four solo studio albums: David Gilmour (1978), About Face (1984), On an Island (2006), and Rattle That Lock (2015). He is also credited for bringing the singer-songwriter Kate Bush to public attention. As a member of Pink Floyd, he was inducted into the US Rock and Roll Hall of Fame in 1996, and the UK Music Hall of Fame in 2005. In 2003, Gilmour was made a Commander of the Order of the British Empire (CBE). He was awarded with the Outstanding Contribution title at the 2008 Q Awards. In 2011, Rolling Stone ranked him number 14 in their list of the greatest guitarists of all time. He was also voted number 36 in the greatest voices in rock by Planet Rock listeners in 2009.

Gilmour has taken part in projects related to issues including animal rights, environmentalism, homelessness, poverty, and human rights. He has married twice and is the father of eight children.

Early life and education
David Jon Gilmour was born on 6 March 1946 in Cambridge, England. His father, Douglas Gilmour, was a senior lecturer in zoology at the University of Cambridge, and his mother, Sylvia (née Wilson), trained as a teacher and later worked as a film editor for the BBC. At the time of Gilmour's birth, they lived in Trumpington, Cambridgeshire. In 1956, after several relocations, they moved to nearby Grantchester Meadows.

Gilmour's parents encouraged him to pursue his interest in music, and in 1954 he bought his first single, Bill Haley's "Rock Around the Clock". His enthusiasm was stirred the following year by Elvis Presley's "Heartbreak Hotel", and later "Bye Bye Love" by the Everly Brothers piqued his interest in the guitar. He borrowed a guitar from a neighbour, but never gave it back. Soon afterward, Gilmour started teaching himself to play using a book and record set by Pete Seeger. At age 11, Gilmour began attending Perse School on Hills Road, Cambridge, which he did not enjoy. There he met the future Pink Floyd members Syd Barrett and Roger Waters, who attended Cambridgeshire High School for Boys, also situated on Hills Road.

In 1962, Gilmour began studying A-Level modern languages at the Cambridgeshire College of Arts and Technology. Despite not finishing the course, he eventually learned to speak fluent French. Barrett was also a student at the college, and he spent his lunchtimes practising guitar with Gilmour. In late 1962, Gilmour joined the blues rock band Jokers Wild. The band recorded a one-sided album and a single at Regent Sound Studio, in Denmark Street, west London, but only 50 copies of each were made.

In August 1965, Gilmour busked around Spain and France with Barrett and some other friends, performing songs by the Beatles. They were arrested on one occasion, and destitute, which resulted in Gilmour requiring treatment in a hospital for malnutrition. He and Barrett later went to Paris, where they camped outside the city for a week and visited the Louvre. During this time, Gilmour worked in various places, most notably as the driver and assistant for the fashion designer Ossie Clark.

Gilmour travelled to France in mid-1967 with Rick Wills and Willie Wilson, formerly of Jokers Wild. The trio performed under the name Flowers, then Bullitt, but were not commercially successful. After hearing their covers of chart hits, club owners were reluctant to pay them, and soon after their arrival in Paris, thieves stole their equipment. In France, Gilmour contributed lead vocals to two songs on the soundtrack of the film Two Weeks in September, starring Brigitte Bardot. When Bullitt returned to England later that year, they were so impoverished that their tour bus was completely empty of petrol and they had to push it off the ferry onto the landing.

Career

Success with Pink Floyd 
In 1967, Pink Floyd, composed of Gilmour's Cambridge schoolmates Barrett and Waters with Nick Mason and Richard Wright, released their debut studio album, The Piper at the Gates of Dawn. That May, Gilmour briefly returned to London in search of new equipment. During his stay, he watched Pink Floyd record "See Emily Play" and was shocked to find that Barrett, who was beginning to suffer mental health problems, did not seem to recognise him.

In December 1967, after Gilmour had returned to England, Mason invited him to join Pink Floyd to cover for the increasingly erratic Barrett. Gilmour accepted; they initially intended to continue with Barrett as a non-performing songwriter. One of the band's business partners, Peter Jenner, said the plan was to have Gilmour "cover for Barrett's eccentricities". By March 1968, working with Barrett had become too difficult and he agreed to leave the band. Mason said later: "After Syd, Dave was the difference between light and dark. He was absolutely into form and shape and he introduced that into the wilder numbers we'd created. We became far less difficult to enjoy, I think." 

After the successes of The Dark Side of the Moon (1973) and Wish You Were Here (1975), Waters took greater control of Pink Floyd, writing and singing lead on most tracks. In 1975, Gilmour played on Roy Harper's album HQ (1975).

In 1970, Gilmour attended the Isle of Wight Festival and assisted in the live mix of Jimi Hendrix's performance. Later that decade, Gilmour received a copy of a demo tape by the teenage songwriter Kate Bush from Ricky Hopper, a mutual friend of both families. Impressed, Gilmour paid for Bush, then 16, to record three professional demo tracks to present to record labels. The tape was produced by Gilmour's friend Andrew Powell, who went on to produce Bush's first two studio albums, and the sound engineer Geoff Emerick. Gilmour arranged for EMI executive Terry Slater to hear the tape, who signed her. Gilmour is credited as the executive producer on two tracks on Bush's debut studio album The Kick Inside (1978), including her second single "The Man with the Child in His Eyes". He performed backing vocals on "Pull Out the Pin" on her fourth studio album The Dreaming (1982), and played guitar on "Love and Anger" and "Rocket's Tail" on her sixth, The Sensual World (1989).

First solo works 

By the late 1970s, Gilmour had begun to think that his musical talents were being underused by Pink Floyd. In 1978 he channelled his ideas into his first solo studio album, David Gilmour, which showcased his guitar playing and songwriting. Music written during the finishing stages of the album, but too late to be used, was incorporated into a song by Waters, which became "Comfortably Numb" on the Pink Floyd album The Wall (1979).Wright was fired during the Wall sessions; the relationship between Gilmour and Waters deteriorated during the making of the Wall film and the album The Final Cut (1983). The negative atmosphere led Gilmour to produce his second solo studio album, About Face, in 1984. He used it to express his feelings about a range of topics, from his relationship with Waters to the murder of John Lennon. Gilmour toured Europe and the US, supported by the Television Personalities, who were dropped after the singer, Dan Treacy, revealed Barrett's address on stage. Mason also made a guest appearance on the UK leg of the tour, which despite some cancellations eventually turned a profit. When he returned from touring, Gilmour played guitar with a range of artists and produced the Dream Academy, including their US top-ten hit "Life in a Northern Town" (1986).

Gilmour co-wrote five songs on Harper's album The Unknown Soldier (1980), including "Short and Sweet", which was first recorded for Gilmour's first solo album. In April 1984, Harper made a surprise guest appearance at Gilmour's Hammersmith Odeon gig to sing "Short and Sweet". This was included in Gilmour's Live 1984 concert film. Harper also provided backing vocals on Gilmour's second solo studio album About Face (1984).

In 1985, Gilmour played on Bryan Ferry's sixth solo studio album Boys and Girls, as well as the song "Is Your Love Strong Enough" for the US release of the Ridley Scott–Tom Cruise film Legend (1985). The music video for "Is Your Love Strong Enough" incorporated Ferry and Gilmour into footage from the film. In July that year, Gilmour played with Ferry at the Live Aid concert at Wembley Stadium in London.

Gilmour becomes Pink Floyd leader 
In 1985, Waters declared that Pink Floyd were "a spent force creatively" and attempted to dissolve the band. However, Gilmour and Mason announced that they intended to continue without him. Waters resigned in 1987, leaving Gilmour as the band leader. In 1986, Gilmour purchased the houseboat Astoria, moored it on the River Thames near Hampton Court and transformed it into a recording studio. He produced the Pink Floyd studio album A Momentary Lapse of Reason in 1987, with contributions from Mason and Wright. He felt Pink Floyd had become too driven by lyrics under Waters' leadership, and attempted to "restore the balance" of music and lyrics. In March 1987, Gilmour played guitar for Bush's performance of "Running Up That Hill" at the Secret Policeman's Third Ball. 

Pink Floyd released their second album under Gilmour's leadership, The Division Bell, in 1994. In December 1999, Gilmour played guitar, alongside Mick Green, Ian Paice, Pete Wingfield, and Chris Hall, for Paul McCartney, at a concert at the Cavern Club, in Liverpool, England. This resulted in the concert film Live at the Cavern Club, directed by Geoff Wonfor.

2000s: Pink Floyd reunion and On an Island 
In 2001 and 2002, Gilmour performed six acoustic solo concerts in London and Paris, along with a small band and choir, which was documented on the In Concert release. On 24 September 2004, he performed a three-song set at the Strat Pack concert at London's Wembley Arena, marking the 50th anniversary of the Fender Stratocaster.

On 2 July 2005, Pink Floyd reunited with Waters to perform at Live 8. The performance caused a sales increase of Pink Floyd's compilation album Echoes: The Best of Pink Floyd (2001). Gilmour donated his profits to charities that reflect the goals of Live 8, saying: "Though the main objective has been to raise consciousness and put pressure on the G8 leaders, I will not profit from the concert. This is money that should be used to save lives." He called upon all Live 8 artists to donate their extra revenue to Live 8 fundraising. After the concert, Pink Floyd turned down an offer to tour the US for £150 million. In 2006, Gilmour said that Pink Floyd would likely never tour or write material again. He said: "I think enough is enough. I am 60 years old. I don't have the will to work as much any more. Pink Floyd was an important part in my life, I have had a wonderful time, but it's over. For me it's much less complicated to work alone."

On 6 March 2006, Gilmour's 60th birthday, he released his third solo album, On an Island. It featured contributions by numerous guest musicians, including Wright, and lyrics by Gilmour's wife Polly Samson. It debuted at number 1 on the UK Albums Chart and earned Gilmour his first US top-ten as a solo artist, reaching number six on the Billboard 200. On 10 April 2006, On an Island was certified platinum in Canada, with sales of over 100,000 copies. 

Gilmour toured Europe, US and Canada  in 2006 May 2006, with a band including Wright and the Pink Floyd collaborators Dick Parry, Guy Pratt, and Jon Carin. .A DVD of the tour, Remember That Night – Live at the Royal Albert Hall, was released on 17 September 2007. For the final show of the tour, Gilmour performed with the 38-piece string section of the Polish Baltic Philharmonic orchestra. It was released as the live album and video Live in Gdańsk (2008).

In December 2006, Gilmour released a tribute to Barrett, who died that year, in the form of his own version of Pink Floyd's first single "Arnold Layne". Recorded live at London's Royal Albert Hall, the single featured versions of the song performed by Wright and David Bowie. It reached the UK Top 20 singles chart at number nineteen.

On 25 May 2009, Gilmour participated in a concert at the Union Chapel in Islington, London, with the Malian musicians Amadou & Mariam. The concert was part of the Hidden Gigs campaign against hidden homelessness, organised by the charity Crisis. On 4 July 2009, Gilmour joined his friend Jeff Beck onstage at the Royal Albert Hall. Gilmour and Beck traded solos on "Jerusalem" and closed the show with "Hi Ho Silver Lining". In August 2009, Gilmour released an online single, "Chicago – Change the World", to promote awareness of the plight of Gary McKinnon, who was accused of computer hacking. A re-titled cover of the Graham Nash song "Chicago", it featured MicKinon, Chrissie Hynde and Bob Geldof. It was produced by the long-time Pink Floyd collaborator Chris Thomas.

2010s: reunion with Waters and Rattle that Lock

On 11 July 2010, Gilmour performed for the charity Hoping Foundation with Waters in Oxfordshire, England. The performance was presented by Jemima Goldsmith and Nigella Lawson, and according to onlookers, it seemed that Gilmour and Waters had ended their long-running feud, laughing and joking together along with their respective partners. Gilmour performed "Comfortably Numb" with Waters on 12 May 2011 at the O2, London and, with Nick Mason, played with the rest of the band on "Outside the Wall" at the conclusion of the show.

In October 2010, Gilmour released an album with the electronic duo the Orb, Metallic Spheres. In September 2015, he released his fourth solo studio album, Rattle That Lock. On 14 November 2015, Gilmour was the subject of a BBC Two documentary, David Gilmour: Wider Horizons, billed as "an intimate portrait of one of the greatest guitarists and singers of all time, exploring his past and present."

On 13 September 2017, Gilmour's live album and film Live at Pompeii, which documents the two shows he performed on 7 and 8 July 2016 at the Amphitheatre of Pompeii, were shown at selected cinemas. The album was released on 29 September 2017 and reached number three on the UK Albums Chart. To celebrate the event, Mayor Ferdinando Uliano made Gilmour an honorary citizen of Pompeii. Gilmour said he had several songs which are almost complete which did not make it onto Rattle That Lock.

The Endless River 

From April 2020, Gilmour appeared in a series of livestreams with his family, performing songs by Barrett and Leonard Cohen. On 3 July he released "Yes, I Have Ghosts", his first single since 2015. Its lyrics were written by Samson and features his daughter Romany making her recording debut on backing vocals and harp.

On 7 November 2014, Pink Floyd released The Endless River. Gilmour said it would be Pink Floyd's last studio album, saying: "I think we have successfully commandeered the best of what there is ... It's a shame, but this is the end." There was no supporting tour, as Gilmour felt it was impossible without Wright. In August 2015, Gilmour reiterated that Pink Floyd were "done" and that to reunite without Wright would be wrong. In April 2022, Gilmour and Mason reformed Pink Floyd to release the song "Hey, Hey, Rise Up!" in protest of the Russo-Ukrainian War.

Waters and Gilmour have continued to quarrel, arguing over subjects including album reissues and the use of the Pink Floyd website and social media channels. Mason said in 2018 that Waters did not respect Gilmour, as that "he feels that writing is everything, and that guitar playing and the singing are something that, I won't say anyone can do, but that everything should be judged on the writing rather than the playing". In 2021, Rolling Stone noted that the pair had "hit yet another low point in their relationship". In early 2023, Gilmour's wife, Polly Samson, wrote on Twitter that Waters was antisemitic and "a lying, thieving, hypocritical, tax-avoiding, lip-synching, misogynistic, sick-with-envy megalomaniac". Gilmour responded to the tweet on Twitter: "Every word demonstrably true."

Musical style 
Gilmour credits guitarists such as Pete Seeger, Lead Belly, Jeff Beck, Eric Clapton, Jimi Hendrix, Joni Mitchell, John Fahey, Roy Buchanan, and Hank Marvin of the Shadows as influences. Gilmour said, "I copied – don't be afraid to copy – and eventually something that I suppose that I would call my own appeared."

Writing for the magazine Far Out in 2022, Jordan Potter described Gilmour as having a "unique and constantly developing guitar style" in Pink Floyd, adding that "drawing from a healthy pool of influence, he could devise his own characteristic style, recognised for its sonorous gravity and pitch-perfect lead excursions, which valued precision over speed." Gilmour's lead guitar style is characterised by blues-influenced phrasing, expressive note bends, and sustain. In a 1985 interview, he stated, "I can't play like Eddie Van Halen, I wish I could [...] Sometimes I think I should work at the guitar more. I play every day but I don't consciously practice scales or anything in particular." In 2006, Gilmour added, "[My] fingers make a distinctive sound... [they] aren't very fast, but I think I am instantly recognisable." The Pink Floyd technician Phil Taylor said, "It really is just his fingers, his vibrato, his choice of notes and how he sets his effects ... In reality, no matter how well you duplicate the equipment, you will never be able to duplicate the personality."

Gilmour also plays bass, keyboards, banjo, lap steel, mandolin, harmonica, drums, and saxophone. Gilmour said he played bass on some Pink Floyd tracks, such as the fretless bass on "Hey You", as he could do it more quickly than Waters; he said that Waters would thank him for "winning him bass-playing polls".

Influence 
According to MusicRadar, Gilmour is "a household name among the classic rock crowd, and for a lot of younger guitar fans he's the only 1970s guitarist that matters. For many he's the missing link between Jimi Hendrix and Eddie Van Halen." Writing for the website, Billy Saefong stated Gilmour "isn't as flashy as Jimi Hendrix or Jimmy Page on the stage, but his guitar work outshines most for emotion."

In 1996, Gilmour was inducted into the Rock and Roll Hall of Fame as a member of Pink Floyd. He has been ranked one of the greatest guitarists of all time by publications including Rolling Stone and The Daily Telegraph. In January 2007, Guitar World readers voted Gilmour's solos for "Comfortably Numb", "Time" and "Money" among the top 100 greatest guitar solos. In 2011, Rolling Stone placed Gilmour at number 14 in a list of the hundred greatest guitarists of all time.

Gilmour is cited by Marillion guitarist Steve Rothery as one of his three main influences. John Mitchell, the guitarist of bands including It Bites and Arena, also cites Gilmour as an influence. In 2013, Gary Kemp, the guitarist and songwriter of Spandau Ballet (and also a member of Nick Mason's Saucerful of Secrets) argued that Gilmour's work on The Dark Side of the Moon "must make him the best guitar player in recent history".

Guitars 
For Gilmour's 21st birthday, in March 1967, his parents gave him his first Fender guitar, a white Telecaster with a white pickguard and a rosewood fretboard. He used this guitar when he joined Pink Floyd in 1968, with one of Barrett's Telecasters as a spare.

The Black Strat 

Gilmour used the Black Strat, a Fender Stratocaster, in most Pink Floyd concerts and for every Pink Floyd studio album recorded between 1970 and 1983. Gilmour bought it at Manny's Music in New York City in 1970, after the band's US tour was cancelled due to the theft of their equipment in New Orleans. The guitar, which originally had a rosewood fretboard and a white pickguard, underwent a number of modifications, settling on a black pickguard and maple neck. It was auctioned for charity in 2019 for $3.9 million, making it one of the most expensive guitars ever sold at auction.

Fender Black Strat Signature Stratocaster 
In November 2006, Fender Custom Shop announced two reproductions of Gilmour's Black Strat for release on 22 September 2008. Phil Taylor, Gilmour's guitar technician, supervised this release and has written a book on the history of this guitar. The release date was chosen to coincide with the release of Gilmour's Live in Gdańsk album. Both guitars are based on extensive measurements of the original instrument, each featuring varying degrees of wear. The most expensive is the David Gilmour Relic Stratocaster which features the closest copy of wear on the original guitar. A pristine copy of the guitar is also made, the David Gilmour NOS Stratocaster.

The 0001 Strat 
The 0001 Strat is a Fender Stratocaster with a white body, maple neck, three-way pick up selector and a gold anodized pickguard and gold-plated hardware. Gilmour bought it from guitar technician Phil Taylor, who had purchased it from Seymour Duncan. Duncan states it is a "partscaster", as he assembled it from two different guitars.  Gilmour used the guitar in the 2004 Strat Pack show that commemorated the 50th anniversary of the Stratocaster at Wembley Arena along with one of his Candy Apple Red Stratocasters (famous for their appearances with Gilmour from 1987 to 2004). It has the serial number 0001; however, prototypes had been constructed before this one. The origin of the guitar is unknown, and it is unknown whether it is the real 0001 Strat because the neck (which has the 0001 serial number on it) could have been taken off the original. The model was used as a spare and for slide guitar in subsequent years. In 2019, the 0001 Strat was sold at auction for $1,815,000, setting a new world auction record for a Stratocaster. Gilmour also owns an early 1954 Stratocaster, believed to predate Fender's commercial release of the model.

Other electric guitars 
Along with the Fender models, Gilmour has also used a Gibson Les Paul goldtop model with P-90 pick-ups during recording sessions for The Wall and A Momentary Lapse of Reason. It was used for the guitar solo on "Another Brick in the Wall, Part 2".

Gilmour also plays a Gretsch Duo-Jet, a Gretsch White Falcon, and a "White Penguin". He played a Bill Lewis 24-fret guitar during the Meddle and Dark Side of the Moon recording sessions, and a Steinberger GL model which was his main guitar during A Momentary Lapse of Reason recording sessions.

Acoustics 
Gilmour has used many acoustic guitars, including a Gibson Chet Atkins classical model, and a Gibson J-200 Celebrity, acquired from John Illsley of Dire Straits. Gilmour used several Ovation models including a Custom Legend 1619-4, and a Custom Legend 1613-4 nylon string guitar, both during the Wall recording sessions. Martin models used include a D-35, purchased in New York in 1971, and a D12-28 12-string.

Steel guitar 

Gilmour used a pair of Jedson steel guitars and a Fender 1000 pedal steel frequently in the early 1970s. Originally purchased from a pawn shop while Gilmour was in Seattle in 1970, the Jedson was used during recording of "One of These Days" from Meddle and "Breathe" and "The Great Gig in the Sky" from Dark Side of the Moon. Gilmour also owns a Fender Deluxe lap steel, which he used during The Division Bell tour in 1994. Gilmour also owns a Champ lap steel model. Along with the Fender steel models Gilmour has also used: a Gibson EH150, and two Jedson models: one red (1977-tuned D-G-D-G-B-E for "Shine On You Crazy Diamond, Parts 6–9", 1987–2006: Tuned E-B-E-G-B-E for "High Hopes") and one blonde. He also uses a ZB steel model. Gilmour played pedal steel guitar on the album Blue Pine Trees by Unicorn.

Bass guitars 
Gilmour has played the bass guitar both in the studio and onstage, and has played many bass models including: an Ovation Magnum, a Fender Bass VI, Fender Precision and Jazz bass models and a Charvel fretless (all used during The Wall recording sessions). During the 1991 Amnesty International concert Gilmour used a Music Man Fretless Stingray bass while conducting the house band and again during Spinal Tap's performance of "Big Bottom".

Signature pickups 
In 2004 EMG, Inc. released the DG20 Signature guitar pickup kit for the Fender Stratocaster. The set included three active pick-ups, an EXG Guitar Expander for increased treble and bass frequencies, and a SPC presence control to enhance earthiness and mid-range. The system came pre-wired on a custom 11-hole white pearl pickguard with white knobs. The kit was based on the configuration mounted on Gilmour's red Stratocaster during the Momentary Lapse of Reason and Division Bell tours.

Awards and honours

Gilmour was appointed a Commander of the Order of the British Empire (CBE) in the 2003 Birthday Honours, "for services to music". The award was presented to him at Buckingham Palace, on 7 November that year.

On 22 May 2008, he won the 2008 Ivor Novello Lifetime Contribution Award, recognising his excellence in music writing. Later that year, he was recognised for his outstanding contribution to music by the Q Awards. He dedicated his award to Pink Floyd keyboardist Richard Wright, who died in September 2008. On 11 November 2009, Gilmour received an honorary doctorate from Anglia Ruskin University.

Charity work
Gilmour has supported charities including Oxfam, the European Union Mental Health and Illness Association, Greenpeace, Amnesty International, the Lung Foundation, Nordoff-Robbins music therapy, Teenage Cancer Trust, and People for the Ethical Treatment of Animals (PETA). In May 2003, Gilmour sold his house in Little Venice to the ninth Earl Spencer and donated the proceeds worth £3.6 million to Crisis to help fund a housing project for the homeless. He has been named a vice-president of the organisation. He donated £25,000 to the Save the Rhino foundation in exchange for Douglas Adams's name suggestion for the album that became The Division Bell.

On 20 June 2019, Gilmour auctioned 120 of his guitars for charity, at Christie's in New York, including his Black Strat, his #0001 and early 1954 Stratocasters, and his 1955 Les Paul. The Black Strat sold for $3,975,000, making it the most expensive guitar ever sold at auction. The auction raised $21,490,750, with the proceeds going to the environmentalist charity ClientEarth.

Personal life
Gilmour's first marriage was to the American-born model and artist Virginia "Ginger" Hasenbein, on 7 July 1975. The couple had four children: Alice (born 1976), Clare (born 1979), Sara (born 1983) and Matthew (born 1986). They originally attended a Waldorf school, but Gilmour called their education there "horrific". In 1994, he married the writer Polly Samson; his best man was his teenage friend and Pink Floyd album artwork designer Storm Thorgerson.

Gilmour and Samson have four children: Gilmour's adopted son Charlie (born 1989 to Samson and Heathcote Williams), Joe (born 1995), Gabriel (born 1997) and Romany (born 2002). Charlie's voice can be heard on the telephone to Steve O'Rourke at the end of "High Hopes" from The Division Bell. Gabriel performed piano on the song "In Any Tongue" on Gilmour's fourth solo studio album Rattle That Lock (2015), making his recording debut. In 2011, Charlie was jailed for 16 months for violent disorder during a London protest against tuition fees.

Gilmour does not believe in an afterlife and is an atheist. He has stated that he is left-wing. He said that his parents were "Proper Manchester Guardian readers… Some of their friends went on the Aldermaston Marches. Mine never did to my knowledge, but they were both committed to voting for the Labour Party." He described himself as a socialist, "even if I can't quite stick with party politics". In August 2014, Gilmour was one of 200 public figures who were signatories to a letter to The Guardian expressing their hope that Scotland would vote to remain part of the United Kingdom in the Scottish independence referendum. In May 2017, Gilmour endorsed Labour Party leader Jeremy Corbyn in the 2017 UK general election. He tweeted: "I'm voting Labour because I believe in social equality."

Gilmour is an experienced pilot and aviation enthusiast. Under the aegis of his company, Intrepid Aviation, he amassed a collection of historical aircraft. He later sold the company, which he had started as a hobby, feeling that it was becoming too commercial for him to enjoy; he said he retained an old biplane which he flew sometimes. Gilmour's net worth is £115 million, according to the Sunday Times Rich List 2018.

Gilmour has a home near the village of Wisborough Green, Sussex. In 2015, he purchased Medina House, a derelict Turkish bathhouse in Brighton and Hove, and had it redeveloped. Gilmour also spends time at his recording studio houseboat Astoria near Hampton Court.

Discography

Studio albums
 David Gilmour (1978)
 About Face (1984)
 On an Island (2006)
 Rattle That Lock (2015)

Tours
About Face Tour (1984)
On an Island Tour (2006)
Rattle That Lock Tour (2015–2016)

Live band members

About Face Tour 
 David Gilmour – guitars, vocals, piano
 Mick Ralphs – guitars, vocals, piano
 Mickey Feat – bass guitar, vocals
 Gregg Dechert – keyboards, vocals
 Chris Slade – drums, percussion
 Jody Linscott – percussion (March–June)
 Sue Evans – percussion (5–16 July)
 Raphael Ravenscroft – saxophones, flute, keyboards

Guests 

 Nick Mason – drums
 Roy Harper – vocals, percussion

"In Concert" shows 
 David Gilmour – guitars, lap steel guitar, vocals
 Neil MacColl – guitars, backing vocals
 Michael Kamen – piano, English horn
 Chucho Merchán – double bass
 Caroline Dale – cello
 Dick Parry – baritone and tenor saxophones
 Nic France – drums, percussion
 Sam Brown (choir leader), Chris Ballin, Pete Brown, Margo Buchanan, Claudia Fontaine, Michelle John Douglas, Sonia Jones, Carol Kenyon, David Laudat, Durga McBroom, Aitch McRobbie (solo on Smile), Beverly Skeete – gospel choir

Guests 

 Bob Geldof – vocals (January 2002)
 Robert Wyatt – vocals (June 2001)
 Richard Wright – vocals, keyboards (January 2002)

On an Island Tour 

 David Gilmour – guitars, pedal steel guitar, alto saxophone, vocals
 Dick Parry – tenor and baritone saxophone, electric organ, glass harp
 Phil Manzanera – guitars, backing vocals
 Richard Wright – piano, organ, keyboards, vocals
 Guy Pratt – bass guitar, double bass, guitar, glass harp, backing vocals
 Jon Carin – Keyboards, synthesizer, lap steel guitar, backing vocals
 Steve DiStanislao – drums, percussion, backing vocals

Guests 

 David Bowie – vocals (Royal Albert Hall, May 2006)
 David Crosby and Graham Nash – vocals (Royal Albert Hall, May 2006)
 Robert Wyatt – cornet (Royal Albert Hall, May 2006)
 Polish Baltic Philharmonic orchestra, conducted by Zbigniew Preisner (Gdansk, 26 August 2006)
 Leszek Możdżer – piano (Gdansk, 26 August 2006)
 Igor Sklyarov – glass harp (Venice)

Rattle That Lock Tour

Legs 1-3 

 David Gilmour – guitars, console steel guitar, lead vocals, whistling
 Phil Manzanera – guitars, backing vocals
 Guy Pratt – bass guitars, double bass, backing and lead vocals
 Jon Carin – piano, keyboards, guitars, lap steel guitars, backing and lead vocals
 Kevin McAlea – piano, organ, keyboards, accordion
 Steve DiStanislao – drums, percussion, backing vocals
 Theo Travis – saxophones, clarinet (5–19 September)
 João Mello – saxophones, additional keyboards, high-strung acoustic guitar on "In Any Tongue" (23 September onwards)
 Bryan Chambers – backing and lead vocals, additional percussion
 Louise Clare Marshall – backing vocals, additional percussion (except South America)
 Lucita Jules – backing vocals (South America and North America only)

Legs 4-5 

 David Gilmour – guitars, console steel guitar, lead vocals, cymbals, whistling
 Chester Kamen – guitars, backing vocals, harmonica
 Guy Pratt – bass guitars, double bass, backing and lead vocals
 Greg Phillinganes – keyboards, backing and lead vocals
 Chuck Leavell – keyboards, organ, accordion, backing and lead vocals (Leg 4 only)
 Kevin McAlea – keyboards organ, accordion (Leg 5 only)
 Steve DiStanislao – drums, percussion, backing vocals, aeoliphone
 João Mello – saxophones, clarinet, additional keyboards, high-strung acoustic guitar
 Bryan Chambers – backing and lead vocals, additional percussion 
 Lucita Jules – backing and lead vocals
 Louise Clare Marshall – backing and lead vocals, additional percussion (certain dates)

Guests 

 David Crosby and Graham Nash – vocals on (23 September, Royal Albert Hall)
 Gabriel Gilmour – piano (25 September, Royal Albert Hall)
 Leszek Możdżer – piano (Wrocław, 25 June 2016)
 Wrocław Philharmonic Orchestra conducted by Zbigniew Preisner (Wrocław, 25 June 2016)
 Benedict Cumberbatch – vocals (London, 28 September 2016)

Timeline

Notes

References

Sources

Further reading

External links

Official blog

Bootleg recordings

 
1946 births
Living people
20th-century English male singers
20th-century English singers
21st-century English male singers
21st-century English singers
Alumni of Anglia Ruskin University
Blues rock musicians
Commanders of the Order of the British Empire
English atheists
English baritones
English buskers
English male guitarists
English male singer-songwriters
English multi-instrumentalists
English philanthropists
English record producers
English rock guitarists
English rock singers
English session musicians
English socialists
European democratic socialists
Harvest Records artists
Ivor Novello Award winners
Jokers Wild (band) members
Lead guitarists
Love Da Records artists
Musicians from Cambridgeshire
Pedal steel guitarists
People educated at The Perse School
People from Cambridge
People from Grantchester
People from Trumpington
People from Wisborough Green
Pink Floyd members
Progressive rock guitarists
Slide guitarists
Weissenborn players